Puerto Rico Highway 1 (PR-1) is a highway in Puerto Rico that connects the city of Ponce to San Juan. Leaving Ponce, the road heads east and follows a somewhat parallel route along the southern coast of the island heading towards Salinas. At Salinas, the road turns north to cut through the Cordillera Central in its approach to San Juan. Before reaching San Juan, it climbs to make its way to the mountain town of Cayey and then it winds down into the city of Caguas on its final approach to San Juan.

Route description

PR-1 starts in Ponce and ends in San Juan. The route connects important cities such as Salinas, Cayey, and Caguas.

In Ponce, PR-1 intersects PR-2 and PR-52. One of the major roads in Ponce that PR-1 does not intersect is PR-10, which is accessible via an alternate route (PR-5506) through Mercedita Airport. A sign on PR-1 alerts drivers on where to get off to access PR-10.

PR-1 passes through a small portion of the central town of Cidra, merely off the border with Cayey; the exit from PR-52 to Guavate is less than 1 hectometer from the town, and going north all structures and buildings off the road on the right are in Cayey, while the road itself and everything on the left is in Cidra until it enters Caguas just passing the junction with PR-787, which connects PR-1 to the rest of Cidra. This means that Cidra can be reached quickly from the main tollway (PR-52) via Exit 32 to Guavate.

PR-1 is an undivided two-lane road, with some exceptions. In Ponce, it is a six-lane divided highway in its intersection with PR-578 and PR-2 in Sabanetas. There is a short segment in Cayey where PR-1 is also a divided highway. It becomes a divided road once again from Caguas to San Juan at a sector known as "La Muda".

PR-1 is roughly parallel to PR-52 throughout its entire length. Prior to PR-52's inauguration, PR-1 was the route of choice from traveling between Ponce and San Juan.

Signing
PR-1 is signed "PR-1 East" in the segment that travels from Ponce to Salinas, and then signed "PR-1 North" in the segment that travels from Salinas to San Juan. Likewise, the road is signed "PR-1 South" in the segment that travels from San Juan to Salinas and then signed "PR-1 West" in the segment that travels from Salinas to Ponce.

History
A small section from San Juan to Río Piedras was then started. The Carretera Central proceeds south to Cayey along the route of the PR-1, then diverges, and was completed in 1887, taking over 50 years to complete. The modern PR-1 was opened on 10 March 1907.

Major intersections

See also

 List of highways in Ponce, Puerto Rico
 List of highways numbered 1
 List of streets in Ponce, Puerto Rico

References

External links
 

001